Tripti Nadakar (born January 2, 1959) is an Indian actress who worked in Nepali cinema. She has performed in more than a dozen Nepali films. Her hit movies were Samjhana, Kusume Rumal, Saino and Lahure. She and Bhuwan K.C. were dubbed the first golden couple of Nepali film industry. Nadakar was paid Rs. 150,000 to act in ‘Saino’.

Filmography

Awards
 2007, Best Supporting Actress, Nepali Film Award 2064, Aama Ko Kakh

See also 
saino
Kusume Rumal
laure (film)

References

Living people
1969 births
People from Darjeeling
Indian Gorkhas
Indian film actresses
Nepalese film actresses
20th-century Indian actresses
21st-century Indian actresses
20th-century Nepalese actresses
21st-century Nepalese actresses